Ancylis divisana, the two-toned ancylis moth, is a moth of the family Tortricidae. It is found in North America, where it has been recorded from Alabama, Colorado, Florida, Georgia, Illinois, Kentucky, Maine, Maryland, Massachusetts, Michigan, Mississippi, North Carolina, Ohio, Oklahoma, Ontario, Pennsylvania, Quebec, South Carolina, Tennessee, Texas and West Virginia.

The wingspan is 10–13 mm. Adults have been recorded on wing from March to October.

The larvae feed on Carpinus species, Castanea dentata, Quercus species and Platanus species (including Platanus occidentalis).

References

Moths described in 1863
Enarmoniini
Moths of North America